Christopher Francis Higgins  (born 24 June 1955) is a British molecular biologist, geneticist, academic and scientific advisor. He was the Vice-Chancellor of Durham University from 2007 to 2014. He took early retirement on 30 September 2014, following a discussion at Senate on limiting the powers of the Vice Chancellor.  He was previously the director of the MRC Clinical Sciences Centre and Head of Division in the Faculty of Medicine at Imperial College London.

Early life
Higgins was born on 24 June 1955 in Cambridge, England. He studied botany at Grey College, Durham University, graduating with a first class degree in 1976. He was awarded a PhD in 1979 for his study of peptide transporters in the embryos of germinating Barley. Working at University of Dundee, his focus turned to genetics and cell biology.

Career
Higgins was appointed Nuffield Professor of Clinical Biochemistry at the University of Oxford. He has published over 200 papers in leading scientific journals like Nature Science and Cell.

In April 2007, he was appointed Vice-Chancellor of Durham University. He succeeded Sir Kenneth Calman and became the University's 23rd Vice-Chancellor. He took early retirement on 30 September 2014, following a discussion at Senate on limiting the powers of the Vice Chancellor.

Higgins has been recognised by the Institute for Scientific Information (ISI) as a 'Most Highly Cited' author. Further awards have been the CIBA Medal, Fleming Prize, and a Howard Hughes International Scholarship  along with election to Fellow of the European Molecular Biology Organization, the Royal Society of Edinburgh, the Royal Society of Arts and the Academy of Medical Sciences.

Alongside his academic success, Professor Higgins has also served as a scientific advisor for the House of Lords Select Committee on Stem Cell Research and advisor to the House of Commons Select Committee on Science and Technology. At present Higgins is the chair of the Spongiform Encephalopathy Advisory Committee, International Review Panel, DKFZ (German National Cancer Centre, Heidelberg) and a trustee of the Kennedy Institute for Rheumatology.

Personal life
Higgins is not currently married, although he has been married twice.  He has five daughters, two from his first marriage and three from the second.

References

1955 births
Living people
Alumni of Grey College, Durham
Alumni of the Royal College of Music
English geneticists
Fellows of the Academy of Medical Sciences (United Kingdom)
Fellows of the Royal Society of Edinburgh
Vice-Chancellors and Wardens of Durham University
Members of the European Molecular Biology Organization